Conus conspersus, common name the sprinkled cone, is a species of sea snail, a marine gastropod mollusk in the family Conidae, the cone snails and their allies.

Like all species within the genus Conus, these snails are predatory and venomous. They are capable of "stinging" humans, therefore live ones should be handled carefully or not at all.

Description
During the 20th. Century, the holotype was misplaced and thought to be lost, but has now (2022) been rediscovered and confirmed  and is once again available to science.

The size of the shell varies between 24 mm and 56 mm.

Distribution
This marine species occurs off the Philippines and Australia.

References

 Reeve, L.A. 1843. Descriptions of new species of shells figured in the 'Conchologia Iconica'. Proceedings of the Zoological Society of London 11: 169–197
 Filmer R.M. (2011) Taxonomic review of the Conus spectrum, Conus stramineus and Conus collisus complexes (Gastropoda – Conidae) – Part I. Visaya 3(2): 23–85
 Puillandre N., Duda T.F., Meyer C., Olivera B.M. & Bouchet P. (2015). One, four or 100 genera? A new classification of the cone snails. Journal of Molluscan Studies. 81: 1–23

External links
 The Conus Biodiversity website
 gastropods.com: Graphiconus spectrum conspersus (var.)
  William J. Fenzan,  MAario Dublanka & Stefan Curth (2022) - Rediscovery of the Conus conspersus Reeve, 1844 holotype, Zootaxa 5154 (4): 496–500

conspersus
Gastropods described in 1844